Gerald Lepkowski is a British-Australian television and stage actor, who has had guest roles in Australian and British productions, before landing the lead role in drama series Dirt Game in Australia in 2009.

Early life 
Born in the Sighthill area of Glasgow, Scotland, Lepkowski is the second child of Edward Lepkowski, a carpet fitter of Polish descent; and Catherine Lepkowski (née Murray). He has a brother, Edward Jr, and a sister, Carol.

While travelling in Australia in his early twenties, Lepkowski became interested in acting and trained at the Western Australian Academy of Performing Arts where he met fellow British-born thespian, Frances O'Connor, with whom he now has one child, Luka, born in 2005. The couple currently reside in the Los Angeles area, in the United States.

Career 
Lepkowski worked extensively in Australia on the stage, and he played Tysefew in 'The Dutch Courtesan', Claudio in Much Ado About Nothing, Roger & Arthur in The Balcony, Vershinin in The Three Sisters, Krogstaad in A Doll's House and Orsino in Twelfth Night, all with the Melbourne Theatre Company.

Lepkowski then went on to appear in several Australian TV series from 1994, starring in The Damnation of Harvey McHugh in a guest role. Since then, he has been in guest roles in other television work, in both Australia and England. Other roles include Neighbours in 1994 Halifax f.p. in 1996, State Coroner in 1997, Monarch of the Glen in 2001, Two Thousand Acres of Sky in 2003, in EastEnders in 2005, among others.

In 2002 he landed the lead role in the award-winning Scottish romantic comedy film, American Cousins, starring alongside Shirley Henderson, Danny Nucci and Hollywood stars Dan Hedaya and Vincent Pastore. The same year he appeared in another British film, Man Dancin', which starred EastEnders actor Alex Ferns.

In 2009, he starred in the lead role of Dirt Game, an Australian drama series that aired on ABC1. This is his first role in a leading part. He is starred in season 2 of East West 101, a drama that aired on SBS. It began airing in mid-October 2009. In 2010, Lepkowski appeared in the Australian telemovie Sisters of War as Bishop Leo Scharmach.

In 2016 he appeared as Zanrush, a red priest, in "The Red Woman", the sixth-season premiere of the HBO series Game of Thrones.

Filmography

References

External links 
 

Year of birth missing (living people)
Living people
Male actors from Glasgow
Scottish expatriates in the United States
Scottish emigrants to Australia
Scottish people of Polish descent
Australian male stage actors
Australian male television actors
Australian people of Polish descent
Australian people of British descent